Cadomites is an extinct ammonite genus from the superfamily Stephanoceratoidea that lived during the Middle Jurassic (upper Bajocian – lower Callovian).

Description
Cadomites is directly descended from Stephanoceras, with a similar collared and lipped aperture rim, but has denser, finer, sharper ribbing. The shell is discoidal, evolute, with a wide umbilicus. The suture is complex.

Distribution
Fossils of species within this genus have been found in the Middle Jurassic sediments in Europe, Africa and South Asia.

References

Bibliography 
 Treatise on Invertebrate Paleontology, Part L, Ammonoidea, -Stephanocerataceae; Geological Society of America, 1957, reprinted 1990

External links
 Ammonites.fr: Ammonites website

Middle Jurassic ammonites
Middle Jurassic ammonites of Europe
Ammonites of Africa
Jurassic animals of Africa
Middle Jurassic Africa
Middle Jurassic ammonites of Asia